Key Club International, also called Key Club, is an international service organization for high school students. As a student-led organization, Key Club's goal is to encourage leadership through serving others. Key Club International is the high school branch of the Kiwanis International family, classifying as a Service Leadership Program and more specifically as a Kiwanis Youth Program. Many Key Clubs are sponsored by a local Kiwanis club.

The organization was started by California State Commissioner of Schools Albert C. Olney and vocational education teacher Frank C. Vincent who work together to establish the first Key Club at Sacramento High School in California on May 7, 1925. Female students were first admitted in 1977, ten years before women were admitted to the sponsoring organization, Kiwanis International.

History

Origin
In California, during the 1920s, adults were concerned with the pernicious side of high school fraternities and sought some means of replacing them with more wholesome activity for youth. In 1924, the local Kiwanis Club decided to attempt to begin a service club at the Sacramento High School, and the school principal eagerly supported the idea and began searching for students willing to start establish the club. In May 1925, a group of boys at Sacramento High School held their first club meeting. Called the "Key Boys", due to their valiant doings, the club eventually became known as Key Club and was associated with Kiwanis International.

Inclusivity
Female students were first allowed to join in 1977 (52 years after the founding of the organization). This occurred ten years before women were admitted to the sponsoring organization, Kiwanis International). 
In 1980 the first females were elected to the Key Club International Board.  Lisa Cross and Renee Wetstein were elected as Key Club International Trustees. In addition, the first African American was elected to serve on the International Board.  Greg Broussard was elected as Key Club International vice-president. In 1996, Craig Melvin was elected as the first African-American president of Key Club International. The 2019 Key Club International Convention's House of Delegates voted to change all references of gender-specific pronouns (i.e., he/him/his or she/her/hers) to the neutral they/them/their pronoun set throughout all of the organization's bylaws. During the same session, the delegation passed a resolution to change the phrase "...my nation and God..." to "...my nation and world..." in the Key Club Pledge; the Kiwanis Youth Programs Board of Directors, directed by the International Guidebook to approve any votes from the House of Delegates, approved the changes.

Present
Key Club International is composed of 32 organized Districts with an additional District in formation (Western Canada). Key Club International is currently in 38 countries. As of 2020, Key Club International includes 229,652 members and 4,841 paid clubs.

Key Club International itself employs three full-time staff members and utilizes the services of the nearly 120 more specialists employed by Kiwanis International—all are employed at Kiwanis International Headquarters in Indianapolis, Indiana.

Past International Boards

Past District Governors

Activities
Key Club offers a range of services to its members: leadership development, study-abroad opportunities, vocational guidance, college scholarships, a subscription to the Key Club magazine, and liability insurance.

In 2002 Key Club officially adopted "caring, character building, inclusiveness, and leadership" as the core values of the organization.

The organization maintains partnerships with UNICEF, AYUSA Global Youth Exchange, the March of Dimes, and Children's Miracle Network Telethon. Through the partnership with UNICEF, a major initiative was launched in 1994 to address HIV/AIDS education and prevention in Kenya.

Theme of the Major Emphasis
At Key Club International's first convention in 1946, the organization was given the responsibility of instituting a program that would bring together all Key Club's direct members' efforts and energies into an area that would truly make an international impact. This tradition is still followed through the development of the Major Emphasis and its Theme.

"Children: Their Future, Our Focus" is Key Club International's Major Emphasis theme. Officially, any project conducted by members or clubs that serve needy children locally or globally is considered a project of the Major Emphasis.  The three preferred charities of Key Club International are paramount to the organization's success in serving children. These are the U.S. Fund for UNICEF, March of Dimes, and Children’s Miracle Network Hospitals.  Key Clubs contribute to a global organizational total of more than 12 million hours of hands-on service and millions of dollars donated to the aforementioned partners and other programs.

Recently, the Kiwanis International has dedicated itself to eliminating the risk of Maternal/Neonatal Tetanus (MNT) from the face of the earth.  The disease plagues mothers and newborns in 40 countries worldwide, and while an effective vaccine has been developed, MNT claims nearly 100,000 lives each year.  As part of the Kiwanis International mission to end MNT, Key Club International has pledged all proceeds from its members' Trick-or-Treat for UNICEF projects to the $110 million funding gap the Kiwanis International Foundation is working to correct.

Service Initiative
The Service Initiative is a program encouraging hands-on service to children aimed towards a common goal. It is changed every two years by the International Board of Trustees.

The 2004–2006 Service Initiative was "Child Safety: Water, Bike and Car Safety", where Key Clubbers participated in different educational events to try to spread safe habits to prevent accidental deaths.

The 2006–2008 Service Initiative was "High Five for Health". It is aimed at reducing childhood obesity and fighting a rising trend that appears to increase the risk of diabetes and heart disease.

The 2008–2010 Service Initiative is "Live 2 Learn". It is focused on 5-to-9-year-old youth, with the main goals of promoting education and building literary skills.

In 2011, the Service Initiative concept was abolished by a vote of the Key Club International Board. It was decided that the freedom of selecting any project in keeping with the theme of "Children: Their Future, Our Focus" would allow for greater success for member clubs and their dedications to service.

Key Club Week
During the first full week of November, known as Kiwanis Family Month, Key Clubs worldwide celebrate Key Club Week. In seven days, Key Clubs are encouraged to grow and serve through themed days like "Show Your K in Every Way", "Konnect the Ks", "Kudos to the Key Players", and more. The week has been designed to become the organization's primary membership drive worldwide with the belief that more members will translate to more service and even greater results in serving the children of the world.

Colors 
The official colors are blue, gold and white.   
   Blue means unwavering character
   Gold means service
   White means purity

Structure and governance
The Key Club District organization is patterned after the original Florida District and its parent Kiwanis Districts. These organizations hold their own annual conventions for fellowship, to coordinate the efforts of individual clubs, to exchange ideas on Key Clubbing, and to recognize outstanding service of clubs or individuals with appropriate awards.

Key Club exists on more than 5,000 high school campuses, primarily in the United States and Canada. It has grown internationally to the Caribbean nations, Central and South America, and most recently to Asia and Australia. Clubs exist in Antigua and Barbuda, Aruba, Australia, Bahamas, Barbados, Bermuda, Canada, Cayman Islands, Colombia, Costa Rica, Dominica, Ecuador, England, Germany, Guadeloupe, Guyana, Hungary, Italy, Jamaica, Malaysia, Martinique, New Caledonia, New Zealand, Panama, Philippines, Singapore, South Korea, St. Lucia, Taiwan, Thailand, Trinidad and Tobago, Turks and Caicos Islands, the United Arab Emirates and the United States of America.

Key Club International is an organization of individual Key Clubs and is funded by nominal dues paid by every member. Offices/positions are most often elected (or otherwise appointed by elected officers) and are held by high school students aged 14–18 years old.

International
Key Club International encompasses all clubs within the 33 organized Districts and in foreign countries that are not included in any specific District. Key Club International is led by the International Board of Trustees, which is typically composed of the International President, International Vice-President, and 11 International Trustees (Trustees being assigned to three Districts and also assigned to serve on various committees within the board). Furthermore, the International Council is composed of the International Board, as well as the District Governor from each of the 33 organized Districts. International Board members are elected at the annual international convention, also known as ICON.

The 2022-2023 International committees include the Executive committee, which focuses on bylaws and policies, proposals for the Kiwanis Youth Programs Board, International Competition, the Strategic Plan, and more; In addition, the global relations committee has a heavy focus on growth abroad, supporting international districts, and nondistricted/district-in-formation club communication. 

Finally, the programs and partners committee aims to connect Key Club International with other branches of the K-family, bridge the gap between KCI and our service partners, and to shape annual programs.

District
A Key Club District is normally defined by state or nation and tends to match a similar Kiwanis District. Each District is chaired by a Governor, elected by delegates to an annual convention. The District is divided into Divisions which tend to, but do not necessarily match Kiwanis Divisions.

Each District and District-in-Formation is led by a group of students comprising the District Board of Trustees.  The Executive District Board commonly includes the Governor, Secretary, Treasurer (or Secretary-Treasurer), and Editor. Along with these positions, the Illinois Eastern Iowa District has a Statistical Secretary. Each District Board also includes one Lieutenant Governor per Division to serve the geographically smaller areas.  Whereas one Governor may oversee the operations of an entire District (often the size of one or more states in the United States or a nation in the Caribbean), Lieutenant Governors oversee areas typically including 4–15 clubs. All officers are elected by the students they serve.

Governor (District Governor) 
The District Governor is the highest-ranking student leader in a District and represents the District at all international events. Responsibilities include overseeing the District Board and ensuring the District's progress in its practical and fundraising goals.

District Secretary 
The District Secretary's primary responsibilities include maintaining records for a District (meeting minutes, monthly report forms, etc.).

District Treasurer 
The District Treasurer's primary responsibilities include preparing financial reports for a District, including but not limited to information about the progress of the District's Key Clubs in dues payment, and sending dues notifications to Key Clubs throughout the year.

District Secretary-Treasurer 
The District Secretary-Treasurer's primary responsibilities are those of the District Secretary (maintaining records for a District) and District Treasurer (preparing financial reports and sending dues notifications). Districts without both a District Secretary and District Treasurer often opt for a District Secretary-Treasurer.

District Bulletin Editor 
The District Bulletin Editor's primary responsibility is to produce at least two major District publications to be sent to all Key Clubs in the District.

District Webmaster 
The District Webmaster's primary responsibility is to maintain the website for the District.

Division
Districts are divided into multiple smaller geographic regions which are typically called Divisions.  Each Division is made up of several clubs and is usually led by a single Lieutenant Governor.

Lieutenant Governor 
A Lieutenant Governor (also Lt. Governor or LTG) is elected to lead and represent a single Division in a District. The Lt. Governor serves as a liaison between individual high school clubs in their Division and the District board. In addition to fulfilling the responsibilities of a Key Club member, Lt. Governors must also visit each of the clubs they serve, publish a monthly Divisional newsletter, hold regular Division Council Meetings or Officer Council Meetings, collaborate with other Lt. Governors to organize training conferences, and keep in contact their with clubs, District executive board, and Kiwanis counterparts. A Lt. Governor may initiate community service projects to help the members of the Division become more involved. A Lt. Governor may choose to create a Division leadership team to delegate some of these responsibilities.

The Lt. Governor is responsible for oversight of, on average, 4–15 high school Key Clubs. One of the Lt. Governor's duties is to plan an election to determine their successor near the end of their term.

The Lt. Governor's role on the District Board is to act as a representative of their governing Division. Lt. Governors make up the majority composition of the District Board, with over sixty members in some larger Districts. Changes and adoption of policies are debated by the board and can be approved by a simple majority vote.

Clubs
Individual Key Clubs are the foundation upon which Key Club International is built; they are the direct or indirect beneficiary of all policy initiatives within Key Club International. The following are officer positions that Key Club International offers handbooks for: club president, club vice president, club secretary, club treasurer, club bulletin editor, and club webmaster. 

Financially, every Key Club member pays $7 to Key Club International and up to $7 to their District through dues, depending on the District (for a total of up to $14). Club dues are paid through Kiwanis International's Membership Update Center. Key Clubs are assigned statuses by Kiwanis International indicating the timeliness of club dues submission, as shown in the following diagram:

Elections
Key Club is one of the only internationally structured high school organizations led by high school students. There are five distinct levels in the organization's leadership hierarchy: International, District, Region, Division, and Club.

International 
International Offices are elected at International Convention (ICON) each summer during the meeting of the House of Delegates.

In caucusing sessions held prior to the House of Delegates meeting, no more than two President and Vice President candidates and no more than 14 Trustee candidates are nominated for election. While only 11 positions for trustee are available, 14 are nominated for election as the organization bylaws dictate that the minimum number of trustee candidates on the ballot “...shall not be less than the number to be elected plus one and not more than the number to be elected plus three...” notwithstanding cases of dual domination of President and/or Vice President candidates in which cases this minimum number could increase up to 16.

During international election, district-endorsed candidates (no more than 2 from each district) for IP, IVP, and IT caucus in district rooms, sharing their platform and taking questions. Post caucusing, Key Club members nominate 14 to proceed to the House of Delegates. This number may be reduced if dual nomination for a IP or IVP candidate is considered. At House of Delegates, the International President, Vice President, and 11 trustees are elected to the board by delegate votes. 

Each club present at the convention can then send no more than two delegates to the House of Delegates where (in addition to amendments that are discussed and voted upon) the International President, Vice President, and Trustees are elected. The current International Board, all District Governors, and all Immediate Past District Governors are delegates at large, meaning they can vote independent of their club.

District 
District-level positions are often elected at annual District conventions (usually held during March, April, or May), where Key Club members, advisers, Kiwanis members, and guests are in attendance. Activities often include forums and workshops, facilitated by the District Board; awards and recognition ceremonies; a Governor's ball or banquet; a less formal dance; a keynote speaker; and several general sessions for remaining convention business. Caucuses, or questioning periods, are held to elect the new District Executive Officers (governor, secretary, treasurer, editor, webmaster, etc.) for the upcoming service year.

Many Districts brand their conventions differently in order to better reflect event goals. For example, a District convention is referred to as "District Leadership Conference" in the Missouri-Arkansas District, "District Educational Convention" in the New England District, "District Leadership Training Conference" in the New York District, "District Convention/Leadership Conference" in the Pennsylvania District and "District Education and Leadership Conference" in the Florida District.

Region 
A region is made up of different divisions. Elections are not held for regions, which is why people may not consider it a level in Key Club.

Division 
Lieutenant Governors can be elected at a Division level, though this varies by each District's bylaws. Division elections may also include Divisional committees or other leadership roles, again varying by each District's own preference.

Club 
The president, vice president(s), secretary, treasurer, bulletin editor and webmaster or technology-associated position of the club should be elected each year in February. While not taking office until May, the intent of the early election is to allow for role-based shadowing and knowledge-transfer from existing to future officers. In between club elections and the date that future officers take their positions, there are District level conferences/conventions where future officers can be trained and advised on how to best work in their upcoming role.

The Webmaster has different duties depending on the District they hail from. The Webmaster is typically responsible for creating, updating, and maintaining the District website.

Notable former Key Club members 

Jensen Ackles, actor, director, singer/musician 
Brian Baumgartner, actor, director, producer, chili chef 
Richard Burr, Richard J. Reynolds High School in Winston-Salem, North Carolina, U.S. Senator from North Carolina (2004–present)
Bo Carter, College Sports Information Directors of America Hall of Fame member
Bill Clinton, President of the United States, 1993–2001 (Missouri-Arkansas District)
William P. Crowell, Key Club International President 1957-1958 Deputy Director of the National Security Agency, 1994–1997 (Ft. Meade, Md.)
Tom Cruise, actor
Millard Fuller, Lanett, Alabama, founder of Habitat for Humanity and The Fuller Center for Housing
Perez Hilton, American blogger
Andrew Holness, Prime Minister of Jamaica
Bob Iger, former Chairman and CEO of The Walt Disney Company
Alan Jackson, country singer
Jake Johannsen, comedian
Tommy John, Major League Baseball player
Hamilton Jordan, Former White House Chief of Staff
Stephen F. Kolzak, Hollywood casting director
Ricki Lake, television talk show hostess
Trent Lott, former U.S. Senator
Richard Lugar, former U.S. Senator
Craig Melvin, broadcast journalist and news anchor
Laura Marano, actress
Joe Namath, professional football player
Bill Nelson, Key Club International President 1959–60, U.S. Senator and astronaut
Brad Pitt, actor (Missouri-Arkansas District)
William F. Poe, Mayor of Tampa, 1974–79, Key Club president of Hillsborough High School, Tampa, Florida
Elvis Presley, singer, actor, philanthropist 
Darius Rucker, lead singer of Hootie & the Blowfish, Middleton High School, Charleston, South Carolina
Stuart Scott, ESPN Sportscaster, Richard J. Reynolds High School in Winston-Salem, North Carolina
Sam Shepard, playwright, actor, author, screenwriter, and director
Howard Stern, Radio DJ
Jim Guy Tucker, Governor of Arkansas (1992–1996)
Ron Underwood, director
James Van Der Beek, actor
Steve Young, professional football player

References

External links

District Websites

 Alabama
 Bahamas
 California-Nevada-Hawaii
 California-Nevada-Hawaii KIWIN'S
 Capital
 Caribbean-Atlantic
 Carolinas
 Eastern Canada
 Florida
 Georgia
 Illinois-Eastern Iowa
 Indiana
 Jamaica
 Kansas
 Kentucky-Tennessee
 Louisiana-Mississippi-West Tennessee
 Michigan
 Minnesota-Dakotas
 Missouri-Arkansas
 Montana
 Nebraska-Iowa
 New England and Bermuda
 New Jersey
 New York
 Ohio
 Pacific Northwest
 Pennsylvania
 Rocky Mountain
 Southwest
 Texas-Oklahoma
 Utah-Idaho
 West Virginia
 Western Canada
 Wisconsin-Upper Michigan

Kiwanis Family
 K-Kids
 Builders Club
 Key Club International
 Circle K International
 Aktion Club
 Kiwanis International

Key Club Programs
 Breakthrough
 Bring Up Grades
 Key Leader
 Terrific Kids

1925 establishments in the United States
Student organizations established in 1925
Education in Indianapolis
Kiwanis
Service organizations based in the United States
Youth organizations based in Indiana
Non-profit organizations based in Indianapolis